Aebh Kelly (born 5 June 1997) is an Irish mezzo-soprano   based at the Mascarade Opera Studio in Florence, Italy. 

Kelly completed her bachelor's degree in music performance at the Royal Irish Academy of Music in 2020 and continued her studies there on a professional mentorship programme under the direction of Virginia Kerr and Dearbhla Collins. In 2020-21, Kelly was an ABL Aviation Opera Studio member with Irish National Opera where she performed in their 20 Shots of Opera, La Boheme, and A Thing I Cannot Name productions.

Engagements
2021 - Collaboration with the Masquerade Opera studio for the Celebration of the Queen's Platinum Jubilee. 
2020 - Recitalist with the Irish National Opera orchestra at Tara Erraught's, 'A Celebration of the Voice' series, hosted by Drogheda Classical Music.
2018 - Finalist in the Gervase Elwes Memorial Cup in the ESB Feis Ceoil, RDS Concert Hall.
2017 - Recitalist at the John McCormack Society's annual event in Mansion House, Dublin.
2016 - ESB Feis Ceoil Young Performers’ Platform Series, John Field Room, NCH.

References

1997 births
21st-century Irish singers
Living people
Irish sopranos
People from Fingal
21st-century Irish women singers